John Martis (born 30 March 1940) is a Scottish former professional footballer who made nearly 500 appearances in the Scottish Football League and was capped once for the Scotland national side.

Playing career
Martis signed for Motherwell in 1957 from local Junior side Royal Albert and became known as one of the "Ancell Babes" under the tutelage of then manager Bobby Ancell, alongside players such as Pat Quinn and Ian St. John. A solid and uncompromising centre half, he remained at Fir Park for twelve seasons before departing for a brief spell in South Africa with Hellenic FC. On his return to Scotland, he joined East Fife, for whom he played for six years before retiring in 1975.

A youth international, he won his only full cap for Scotland against Wales in a British Home Championship fixture in 1960.

On 2 November 2021, it was announced that Martis was to be inducted into the Motherwell F.C. Hall of Fame.

References

External links

Motherwellnet - Player archive profile

1940 births
Living people
Motherwell F.C. players
Hellenic F.C. players
East Fife F.C. players
Scotland international footballers
Scottish footballers
Scottish Football League players
Scottish Junior Football Association players
Scotland under-23 international footballers
Association football central defenders